The 2001–02 season was the 54th season in the history of Málaga CF and the club's third consecutive season in the top flight of Spanish football. In addition to the domestic league, Málaga participated in this season's editions of the Copa del Rey. The team finished the season in 10th place and as a result qualified for the UEFA Intertoto Cup.

Squad

Transfers

In

Out

Competitions

Overview

La Liga

League table

Results summary

Results by round

Matches

Copa del Rey

References

Málaga CF seasons
Málaga